Crismery Dominga Santana Peguero (born 20 April 1995) is a Dominican Republic weightlifter.

She participated at the 2018 World Weightlifting Championships, winning a medal.

She represented the Dominican Republic at the 2020 Summer Olympics, She won the bronze medal in the Women's 87 kg event.

She won the bronze medal in the women's +87kg event at the 2022 Pan American Weightlifting Championships held in Bogotá, Colombia. She also won medals in the Snatch and Clean & Jerk events in this competition.

References

External links
 

1995 births
Living people
Dominican Republic female weightlifters
World Weightlifting Championships medalists
Pan American Games medalists in weightlifting
Pan American Games silver medalists for the Dominican Republic
Weightlifters at the 2019 Pan American Games
Medalists at the 2019 Pan American Games
Pan American Weightlifting Championships medalists
Weightlifters at the 2020 Summer Olympics
Medalists at the 2020 Summer Olympics
Olympic bronze medalists for the Dominican Republic
Olympic medalists in weightlifting
Olympic weightlifters of the Dominican Republic
21st-century Dominican Republic women